Dreadnought, subtitled "Surface Combat in the Battleship Era, 1906-45", is a naval board wargame published Simulations Publications, Inc. (SPI) in 1975.

Description
Dreadnought is a wargame that simulates battles between battleships.

Components
The game includes:
Six 10" x 10.75" plain hex grid map sections scaled to 1800 m (1968 yd) per hex
 400 die-cut counters
16-page rulebook
2 Player Aid Cards
Orders Pad
two 6-sided dice

Gameplay
Counters are provided for every battleship that sailed from 1906 to 1945. Several historical and hypothetical scenarios are provided. Each game turn represents 15 minutes within in the battle. Elements of pre-radar ship-to-ship combat are present, including rangefinding, torpedoes, gunnery, and damage control.  If ships sail off the edge of the map, another map piece is placed so that the map is extended in that direction.

Publication history
Dreadnought was designed by Irad B. Hardy and John Young, with artwork by Redmond A. Simonsen. It was published by SPI in 1975 as a full-sized boxed set and as a flat-box with a clear plastic lid. It was a bestselling game for SPI, rising to the top of SPI's Top 10 list the month after it was released, and staying in the Top 10 for a year.

Reception
In a 1976 poll of wargamers conducted by SPI to determine the most popular wargames published in North America, Dreadnought was very popular, placing 7th out of 202 games.

In Issue 54 of Games & Puzzles (November 1976), Nick Palmer noted that this game was more of an operational game than a tactical game, but still felt the game had "sudden changes in fortune and tension over every salvo." He commented that the interest of the game was increased by "an unusually well-thought-out set of scenarios, with some particularly attractive campaign versions allowing the players to choose their own forces for various specified tasks."  He concluded by giving the game an above-average Excitement rating of 4 out of 5. In his 1977 book The Comprehensive Guide to Board Wargaming, Palmer continued in this vein, calling Dreadnought "an excellent game" and noting "Rather unusually in a naval game, the accent is on playability rather than enormous detail, and the result is fast-moving and frequently tensely exciting."

In Issue 24 of Moves, Steve List compared Dreadnought to Avalon Hill's Jutland, and found that complex maneuvering in Jutland is difficult, but "since [Dreadnoughts] mechanics of movement are simple and straight-forward. intricate maneuvers are quite feasible and can be considered the main point of the game." While List found that "Dreadnought is far more convenient to play", he thought that "Anyone interested in naval warfare should have both games in his collection."

In The Guide to Simulations/Games for Education and Training, Martin Campion thought this game could be adapted to the classroom, saying, "The game does not provide for multiple players but there is a lot of room to introduce more than one on a side."

Other reviews
The Wargamer, Vol.2 #24 
 Phoenix #23
Pursue & Destroy Vol.3, #1

References

External links

Dreadnought Article List

Board games introduced in 1975
Board wargames set in Modern history
Naval board wargames
Simulations Publications games
Wargames introduced in 1975